

This is a list of the National Register of Historic Places listings in Taney County, Missouri.

This is intended to be a complete list of the properties and districts on the National Register of Historic Places in Taney County, Missouri, United States. Latitude and longitude coordinates are provided for many National Register properties and districts; these locations may be seen together in a map.

There are 5 properties and districts listed on the National Register in the county.  Another 2 properties were once listed but have been removed.

Current listings

|}

Former listings

|}

See also
 List of National Historic Landmarks in Missouri
 National Register of Historic Places listings in Missouri

References

 
Taney